The Enmore was a wooden ship-rigged merchantman built by Green Shipbuilders in Bristol in 1858, the last known ship built by the shipyard.

She was built for the Barbadian service for Michael Cavan and Company, a Bristolian shipping line, and named after the old established residence of the firm in 
Enmore, Somerset. Registered in London, was sheathed in felt and copper. In 1859 whilst under Captain Kennedy of Cavan Bros., the Enmore ran aground and was docked in London for repairs to damage and a new keel. She was subsequently sold when Cavan Bros ceased to operate their own vessels and appointed agents for the Royal Mail Steam Packet Company. Later she was rated as a 581t barque.

References 

Ships built in Bristol
Passenger ships of the United Kingdom
1858 ships